MTN South Sudan is the largest telecommunications company in South Sudan, with an estimated 1,700,000 subscribers, accounting for 61.8 percent market share, as of 31 December 2020.

Location
The headquarters of MTN South Sudan are located along B Lupai Lane, in the northeastern part of the city of Juba, the capital and largest city in that country. The geographical coordinates of the headquarters of MTN South Sudan are 4°51'18.0"N, 31°37'06.0"E (Latitude:4.855000; Longitude:31.618333).

Overview
MTN South Sudan is a subsidiary of MTN Group, a multinational telecommunications group connecting approximately 232 million people in 22 countries across Africa and the Middle East. MTN South Sudan was established in 2011, at the time of South Sudan's independence.

Governance
As of January 2020, the chief executive officer of the company is Gordian Kyomukama, previously the acting CEO of MTN Uganda and before that, the chief technology officer at MTN Uganda.

See also
 List of mobile network operators in South Sudan

References

External links
 MTN South Sudan Company Profile

MTN Group
Companies based in Juba
Telecommunications companies established in 2011
2011 establishments in South Sudan
Telecommunications companies of South Sudan
Mobile phone companies of South Sudan